The members of the Parliament of Fiji from 1966 until 1972 consisted of members of the House of Representatives elected between 26 September and 8 October 1966 (at which point it was the Legislative Council), and members appointed to the Senate when it was created at independence in 1970.

House of Representatives

Senate

References

 1966